The Monastery of St. Stephen is an Eastern Orthodox monastery that is part of the Meteora monastery complex in Thessaly, central Greece. It is situated at the top of a rocky precipice. Kukulas (Κουκουλάς) peak (510 m) overlooks the monastery.

In 1961, the monastery was converted into a nunnery.

References

Stephen
Christian monasteries established in the 14th century
Nunneries in Greece